A ministry of energy or department of energy is a government department in some countries that typically oversees the production of fuel and electricity; in the United States, however, it manages nuclear weapons development and conducts energy-related research and development. The person in charge of such a department is usually known as a minister of energy or minister for energy.

 Ministry of Energy and Water (Afghanistan)
 Ministry of Energy and Mining (Algeria)
 Ministry of Energy Infrastructures and Natural Resources (Armenia)
 Australia :
 Department of Climate Change and Energy Efficiency (superseded 2013)
 Department of the Environment and Energy (from 2016)
 Ministry of Energy (Azerbaijan)
 Ministry of Energy, Science & Technology and Public Utilities (Belize)
 Ministry of Mines and Energy (Brazil)
 Ministry of Energy (Brunei)
 Ministry of Economy, Energy and Tourism (Bulgaria)
 Burundi Ministry of Energy and Mines
 Ministry of Mines and Energy (Cambodia)
 Canada : 
 Natural Resources Canada (federal)
 Ministry of Energy (Alberta)
 Department of Energy and Mines (New Brunswick)
 Ministry of Energy (Ontario)
 Ministry of Natural Resources and Wildlife (Quebec)
 Ministry of Mines and Energy (Colombia)
 Ministry of Climate, Energy and Building (Denmark)
 Directorate-General for Energy (European Union)
 Ministry of Electricity and Renewable Energy (Egypt)
 Ministry of Energy of Georgia
 Federal Ministry of Economic Affairs and Energy (Germany)
 Ministry of Energy and Petroleum (Ghana)
 Ministry of Environment and Energy (Greece)
 Ministry of Industry, Energy and Tourism (Iceland)
 India :
 Ministry of New and Renewable Energy
 Ministry of Petroleum and Natural Gas
 Ministry of Energy and Mineral Resources (Indonesia)
 Ministry of Energy (Iran)
 Ministry of Energy (Kazakhstan)
 Ministry of Energy (Lithuania)
 Ministry of Energy, Green Technology and Water (Malaysia)
 Secretariat of Energy (Mexico)
 Ministry of Energy (Moldova)
 Ministry of Energy (Myanmar)
 Ministry of Energy (Nepal)
 Ministry of Petroleum and Energy (Norway)
 Ministry of Water and Power (Pakistan)
 Ministry of Energy and Mines (Peru)
 Department of Energy (Philippines)
 Ministry of Energy (Poland)
 Ministry of Energy (Russia)
 Ministry of Energy, Industry and Mineral Resources (Saudi Arabia)
 Ministry of Mining and Energy (Serbia)
 Ministry of Energy & Minerals (Somaliland)
 Department of Energy (South Africa)
 Ministry of Energy and Electrification (Soviet Union)
 Ministry of Power and Renewable Energy (Sri Lanka)
 Ministry of the Environment and Energy (Sweden)
 Ministry of Energy and Minerals (Tanzania)
 Ministry of Energy (Thailand)
 Ministry of Mines and Energy (Togo)
 Ministry of Energy (Turkmenistan)
 Ministry of Energy and Mineral Development (Uganda)
 Ministry of Energy and Coal Mining (Ukraine) 
 United Kingdom :
 Department of Energy (United Kingdom) (superseded 1994)
 Department of Energy and Climate Change (superseded 2016)
 Department for Business, Energy and Industrial Strategy (from 2016)
 United States Department of Energy
 Ministry of Energy and Power Development (Zimbabwe)

Ministers for Energy:

 Minister for the Environment and Energy (Australia)
 Minister of Energy (Belgium)
 Minister of Energy, Mines and Resources (Canada)
 Minister for Energy (Ireland)
 List of Ministers for Energy of Luxembourg
 Minister for Energy (Sweden)
 Minister for Energy (Western Australia)

See also 
 Ministry of Petroleum